Lecithin citrate is a food additive used as a preservative. Its E number is 344. It is not approved for use in the UK.

References 

Food preservatives